Viktor Kirillovich Kalashnikov (born 8 March 1940); is a Russian politician who was the Governor of Voronezh Oblast, from 16 October 1991 to 18 March 1992, and the Chairman of the Voronezh Regional Executive Committee from August 1990 to December 1990. He worked at the Voronezh mining equipment plant, now "Rudgormash", where he rose to the position of general director.

Kalashnikov became the first Head of Administration in post-Soviet Russia to be sacked by Boris Yeltsin after only five months in office. The president dismissed him for "serious violations committed in the distribution of passenger cars intended for the suppliers of grain and agricultural products, as well as the use of his official position for personal gain." In 1991, the Government of Russia ordered the distribution of cars among peasants, trying to somehow interest them in their work due to the critical situation with the provision of food. As cars were not yet freely sold at that time, reselling performed by Kalashnikov administration was considered illegal.

References

1940 births
Living people
People from Volgograd Oblast
Governors of Voronezh Oblast